Guerilla Poubelle is a French punk band formed in 2003. The name translates to 'Dustbin (Garbage Can) Guerrilla' in English.

Their lyrics are based on anarchist and existentialist beliefs and the band are DIY enthusiasts, lead singer and guitarist Till being behind the record label and concert promoter Guerilla Asso founded in 2004.

History
The band formed as a four-piece, following the break of the ska-punk band Les Betteraves. The band originally incorporated a painter who painted and provided backing vocals during shows.

Their debut album entitled Il faut repeindre le monde… en noir (The world must be repainted… in black) was released in 2005.

Following some line-up changes, the band became a three-piece.

They have released numerous splits and EPs, as well as four albums, releasing music on their own Guerilla Asso, Asian Man Records and Crash Disques.

In the summer of 2006, they released a split album with Coquettish, which was followed by a major Japanese tour. The band has toured widely (France, Europe, Japan, Canada, USA) and played over 1 000 live shows.

Guerilla Poubelle has consistently refused to register with the French royalties collection society SACEM, in line with their values, despite selling a significant number of records for an independent band.

On 22 May 2021, the journalist Donatien Huet posted on French media Mediapart a report on the sexual and psychological violence suffered by women in extreme music scenes in France. Till Lemoine is accused of harassment, but he rejects all those accusations.

Musical style and influences
The band have remained consistent over the years in playing mostly fast, short punk rock songs sung in French, with Till Lemoine's vocal delivery urgent and gritty.

Members
 Till : guitar and vocals
 Antho : bass
 Paul : drums

Past members
 Chamoule: Drums
 Jokoko: painter
 Ken: bass and vocals
Axel: drums
 Alex: drums
 Kojack: bass
 Jamie: bass

Quotes
"(We) do not want our music consumed like yogurt. I want people to be open-minded [...] and not to swallow every word I pronounce... Too many in the French punk scene act this way and for me they are just slaves." — Till

"When you tell people to recycle, they tell you "oh thats great, how good of you!" It's not great or nice, it should be fucking normal."- Till

Discography

Demo
 Dégoût et des couleurs (2003)

Shared releases
 Discographies 2000-20'''4 (split album release with Butter Beans) (2005)
 Ninjas & guerilleros (split album release with Coquettish (band)) (2006)
 Petit hommage entre amis (split album release with Justin(e) and Dolores Riposte, tribute to Zabriskie Point (2007)

Albums
 Il faut repeindre le monde... en noir (2005)
 Punk = Existentialisme (2007)
 GUERILLA POUBELLE + CHARLY FIASCO (2009)
 Amor Fati (2013)
 La nausée (2017)
 L'ennui'' (2020)

References

External links
  

French punk rock groups
Asian Man Records artists
Musical groups from Paris